Transportation Research Part D: Transport and Environment is a peer-reviewed, international scientific journal which publishes work relating to land, sea, and air transportation systems and their impact on environmental systems. It was established in 1996 and is published by Elsevier. The editors-in-chief are Robert Noland (Rutgers University) and Jason Cao (University of Minnesota, Twin Cities).

See also 
 Transportation Research Part A: Policy and Practice
 Transportation Research Part E: Logistics and Transportation Review

References

Earth and atmospheric sciences journals
Environmental science journals
Elsevier academic journals
English-language journals